Surangana Bandyopadhyay (Bengali: সুরঙ্গনা বন্দ্যোপাধ্যায়; born 18 November 1997) is an Indian actress and singer who primarily known for Bengali films and web series.

Early life and education

She appeared on-screen as a child artist, though she started off as a dancer. At the age of nine, she was a participant and a semi-finalist of the popular dance reality show Dance Bangla Dance Junior, aired on Zee Bangla in the year 2007–2008. She studied at  Julien Day School, Ganganagar, an Anglo Indian Christian minority school Near Madhyamgram, Old Jessore Road, She passed her ISC exams in the year 2016. She currently studies at  St. Xavier's College, Kolkata.

Career

Film

The first time she appeared on-screen was in 2008 as a child artist. Her debut film was Aainaate (also spelled Aayena Te, (2008)), directed by Dulal Dey. After which she worked in Chirasathi (2008) directed by Haranath Chakraborty, Maati -O- Manush (2009) directed by Sisir Sahana, 'Jiban Rang Berang' directed by Sanghamitra Chowdhury, Antim Swash Sundar (2010) directed by Kris Alin. She also worked in 'Durga' which was aired on 'Star Jalsa'. In 2012, she worked in Goynar Baksho (2013) directed by Aparna Sen. She has also worked in Golpo Holeo Shotti (2014) directed by Birsa Dasgupta & Megher Meye (2013) directed by Pallab Kirtania, but she did not get the limelight. She came into the spotlight after the releasing of the Bengali movie Open Tee Bioscope. She also made her singing debut in the Anindya Chatterjee film Open Tee Bioscope (2015).

Television

She worked in Bengali mega-serials also. The name of one such serial was Durga, which was aired on Star Jalsha.

Filmography

Films 

Also worked in, Daughter Of Clouds (2015), Thikana (2020), etc.

Web series

Theatre performances 

 Taraye Taraye, an adaptation of Srijato's novel Tara Bhora Akasher Niche, directed by Kaushik Sen, a Swapnasandhani production, 2018.

 Ekla Chawlo Re, an adaptation of Utpal Dutt's play of the same name, directed by Kaushik Sen, a Swapnasandhani production, 2019.

Songs 

Surangana also worked as a playback singer of several films or short films.

Other Activities 

 Surangana acted in the music video of Anupam Roy's 'Putul Aami' in the year 2022 with Riddhi Sen.

References

External links
 

1997 births
Indian film actresses
Living people
Bengali actresses
Actresses from Kolkata
Indian child actresses